Vitaly Korotich is a Soviet, Ukrainian and Russian writer and journalist.
Born in 1936 in Kyiv, he graduated from the Kyiv Medical University in 1959 and worked as a doctor between 1959 and 1966. Later, he became a full-time writer, and served as an officer of the Union of Soviet Writers.

In the late 1970s, Korotich became the editor of Vsesvit. a Ukrainian literary magazine in Kyiv specializing in publishing literary works translated from foreign languages. His magazine was described at the time as one "that probably prints more of the latest American fiction than any magazine in Moscow."

In 1976, Korotich spent three weeks as a writer-in-residence at the University of Kansas in Lawrence, Kansas. In 1984, still the editor-in-chief of Vsesvit, he was in New York as a member of the Ukrainian SSR's delegation at the United Nations General Assembly.
In 1985, he visited Canada as well, participating in a campaign for world peace and for nuclear disarmament.

In the late 1980s and early 1990s Vitaly Korotich was editor-in-chief of Ogonyok magazine in Moscow, which made, some say, a substantial contribution to the promotion of media freedom in the former USSR. The Ogonyok magazine, at the time when Korotich was at its head, was regarded as a "megaphone" for the perestroika and glasnost policies of the last USSR President Mikhail Gorbachev.

«Korotich has given voice and direction to Glasnost.... In his hands Ogonyok became the point of the spear and also a blunt instrument flailing away at the enemies of change and renewal, including Communist party notables and formerly inviolate institutions like the K. G. B. and the Soviet Army. Korotich says that he is on a civilizing mission whose goal is «a normal life in an abnormal society» and explains, «For seventy years, we were taught that the son who betrayed his father, or a person who burned a church, was a hero. People have been living a comprehensive lie. We have to show that it is possible to live here and be normal».
«The New Yorker» 
 
«For his leadership in a new age of journalism in the Soviet Union; for his devotion to reform and democratization despite efforts by conservatives to minimize his influence; and for his work to correct «official» but false history and promote the rehabilitation of victims of Stalinist repression. Korotich becomes World Press Review's 1988 International Editor of the Year. He is the first Soviet journalist to receive our award, which is made annually for the demonstration of courage, enterprise, and leadership in advancing press freedom and responsibility, enhancing world understanding, defending human rights and fostering excellence in journalism».
«The World Press Review», New York 

In 1992 Vitaly Korotich went to the U.S. and was a visiting professor of journalism at Boston University, also lecturing at Boston College on October 19.

References 

1936 births
Living people
Ukrainian journalists
20th-century Russian journalists
Russian magazine editors
Soviet physicians
Soviet writers
Ukrainian editors
Recipients of the Shevchenko National Prize
Soviet journalists
Poets from Kyiv
Journalists from Kyiv
20th-century Russian male writers
Physicians from Kyiv
Ogoniok editors